Electrical telegraphs were point-to-point text messaging systems, primarily used from the 1840s until the late 20th century. It was the first electrical telecommunications system and the most widely used of a number of early messaging systems called telegraphs, that were devised to communicate text messages quicker than physical transportation. Electrical telegraphy can be considered to be the first example of electrical engineering. 

Text telegraphy consisted of two or more geographically separated stations, called telegraph offices. The offices were connected by wires, usually supported overhead on utility poles. Many different electrical telegraph systems were invented, but the ones that became widespread fit into two broad categories. The first category consists of needle telegraphs in which a needle pointer is made to move electromagnetically with an electric current sent down the telegraph line.  Early systems used multiple needles requiring multiple wires.  The first commercial system, and the most widely used needle telegraph, was the Cooke and Wheatstone telegraph, invented in 1837. The second category consists of armature systems in which the current activates a telegraph sounder which makes a click.  The archetype of this category was the Morse system, invented by Samuel Morse in 1838. In 1865, the Morse system became the standard for international communication using a modified code developed for German railways.

Electrical telegraphs were used by the emerging railway companies to develop train control systems, minimizing the chances of trains colliding with each other. This was built around the signalling block system with signal boxes along the line communicating with their neighbouring boxes by telegraphic sounding of single-stroke bells and three-position needle telegraph instruments.

In the 1840s, the electrical telegraph superseded optical telegraph systems, becoming the standard way to send urgent messages. By the latter half of the century, most developed nations had created commercial telegraph networks with local telegraph offices in most cities and towns, allowing the public to send messages called telegrams addressed to any person in the country, for a fee. 

Beginning in 1850, submarine telegraph cables allowed for the first rapid communication between continents. Electrical telegraph networks permitted people and commerce to transmit messages across both continents and oceans almost instantly, with widespread social and economic impacts. Circa 1894, the electric telegraph led to Guglielmo Marconi's invention of wireless telegraphy, the first means of radiowave telecommunication. 

In the early 20th century, manual telegraphy was slowly replaced by teleprinter networks. Increasing use of the telephone pushed telegraphy into a few specialist uses. Use by the general public was mainly special occasion telegram greetings. The rise of the internet and usage of email in the 1990s largely put an end to dedicated telegraphy networks.

History

Precursors 

Prior to the electric telegraph, visual systems were used, including beacons, smoke signals, flag semaphore, and optical telegraphs for visual signals to communicate over distances of land. 

An auditory predecessor was West African talking drums. In the 19th century, Yoruba drummers used talking drums to mimic human tonal language to communicate complex messages - usually regarding news of birth, ceremonies, and military conflict - over 4-5 mile distances.

Early work

From early studies of electricity, electrical phenomena were known to travel with great speed, and many experimenters worked on the application of electricity to communications at a distance. All the known effects of electricity—such as sparks, electrostatic attraction, chemical changes, electric shocks, and later electromagnetism—were applied to the problems of detecting controlled transmissions of electricity at various distances.
	
In 1753, an anonymous writer in the Scots Magazine suggested an electrostatic telegraph. Using one wire for each letter of the alphabet, a message could be transmitted by connecting the wire terminals in turn to an electrostatic machine, and observing the deflection of pith balls at the far end. The writer has never been positively identified, but the letter was signed C.M. and posted from Renfrew leading to a Charles Marshall of Renfrew being suggested. Telegraphs employing electrostatic attraction were the basis of early experiments in electrical telegraphy in Europe, but were abandoned as being impractical and were never developed into a useful communication system.

In 1774, Georges-Louis Le Sage realised an early electric telegraph. The telegraph had a separate wire for each of the 26 letters of the alphabet and its range was only between two rooms of his home.

In 1800, Alessandro Volta invented the voltaic pile, providing a continuous current of electricity for experimentation. This became a source of a low-voltage current that could be used to produce more distinct effects, and which was far less limited than the momentary discharge of an electrostatic machine, which with Leyden jars were the only previously known man-made sources of electricity.
	 	
Another very early experiment in electrical telegraphy was an "electrochemical telegraph" created by the German physician, anatomist and inventor Samuel Thomas von Sömmering in 1809, based on an earlier, less robust design of 1804 by Spanish polymath and scientist Francisco Salva Campillo. Both their designs employed multiple wires (up to 35) to represent almost all Latin letters and numerals. Thus, messages could be conveyed electrically up to a few kilometers (in von Sömmering's design), with each of the telegraph receiver's wires immersed in a separate glass tube of acid. An electric current was sequentially applied by the sender through the various wires representing each letter of a message; at the recipient's end, the currents electrolysed the acid in the tubes in sequence, releasing streams of hydrogen bubbles next to each associated letter or numeral. The telegraph receiver's operator would watch the bubbles and could then record the transmitted message. This is in contrast to later telegraphs that used a single wire (with ground return).
	 	
Hans Christian Ørsted discovered in 1820 that an electric current produces a magnetic field that will deflect a compass needle. In the same year Johann Schweigger invented the galvanometer, with a coil of wire around a compass, that could be used as a sensitive indicator for an electric current. Also that year, André-Marie Ampère suggested that telegraphy could be achieved by placing small magnets under the ends of a set of wires, one pair of wires for each letter of the alphabet. He was apparently unaware of Schweigger's invention at the time, which would have made his system much more sensitive. In 1830 William Ritchie improved on Ampère's design by placing the magnetic needles inside a coil of wire connected to each pair of conductors. He successfully demonstrated it, showing the feasibility of the electromagnetic telegraph, but only within a lecture hall.
	 	
In 1825, William Sturgeon invented the electromagnet, with a single winding of uninsulated wire on a piece of varnished iron, which increased the magnetic force produced by electric current. Joseph Henry improved it in 1828 by placing several windings of insulated wire around the bar, creating a much more powerful electromagnet which could operate a telegraph through the high resistance of long telegraph wires. During his tenure at The Albany Academy from 1826 to 1832, Henry first demonstrated the theory of the 'magnetic telegraph' by ringing a bell through  of wire strung around the room in 1831.

In 1835, Joseph Henry and Edward Davy independently invented the mercury dipping electrical relay, in which a magnetic needle is dipped into a pot of mercury when an electric current passes through the surrounding coil. In 1837, Davy invented the much more practical metallic make-and-break relay which became the relay of choice in telegraph systems and a key component for periodically renewing weak signals. Davy demonstrated his telegraph system in Regent's Park in 1837 and was granted a patent on 4 July 1838. Davy also invented a printing telegraph which used the electric current from the telegraph signal to mark a ribbon of calico infused with potassium iodide and calcium hypochlorite.

First working systems

The first working telegraph was built by the English inventor Francis Ronalds in 1816 and used static electricity. The lines were connected at both ends to revolving dials marked with the letters of the alphabet and electrical impulses sent along the wire were used to transmit messages. Offering his invention to the Admiralty in July 1816, it was rejected as "wholly unnecessary". His account of the scheme and the possibilities of rapid global communication in Descriptions of an Electrical Telegraph and of some other Electrical Apparatus was the first published work on electric telegraphy and even described the risk of signal retardation due to induction. Elements of Ronalds' design were utilised in the subsequent commercialisation of the telegraph over 20 years later.

The Schilling telegraph, invented by Baron Schilling von Canstatt in 1832, was an early needle telegraph.  It had a transmitting device that consisted of a keyboard with 16 black-and-white keys. These served for switching the electric current. The receiving instrument consisted of six galvanometers with magnetic needles, suspended from silk threads. The two stations of Schilling's telegraph were connected by eight wires; six were connected with the galvanometers, one served for the return current and one for a signal bell. When at the starting station the operator pressed a key, the corresponding pointer was deflected at the receiving station. Different positions of black and white flags on different disks gave combinations which corresponded to the letters or numbers. Pavel Schilling subsequently improved its apparatus by reducing the number of connecting wires from eight to two.
	 	
On 21 October 1832, Schilling managed a short-distance transmission of signals between two telegraphs in different rooms of his apartment. In 1836, the British government attempted to buy the design but Schilling instead accepted overtures from Nicholas I of Russia. Schilling's telegraph was tested on a  experimental underground and underwater cable, laid around the building of the main Admiralty in Saint Petersburg and was approved for a telegraph between the imperial palace at Peterhof and the naval base at Kronstadt. However, the project was cancelled following Schilling's death in 1837. Schilling was also one of the first to put into practice the idea of the binary system of signal transmission. His work was taken over and developed by Moritz von Jacobi who invented telegraph equipment that was used by Tsar Alexander III to connect the Imperial palace at Tsarskoye Selo and Kronstadt Naval Base.
	
In 1833, Carl Friedrich Gauss, together with the physics professor Wilhelm Weber in Göttingen installed a  wire above the town's roofs. Gauss combined the Poggendorff-Schweigger multiplicator with his magnetometer to build a more sensitive device, the galvanometer. To change the direction of the electric current, he constructed a commutator of his own. As a result, he was able to make the distant needle move in the direction set by the commutator on the other end of the line.

At first, Gauss and Weber used the telegraph to coordinate time, but soon they developed other signals and finally, their own alphabet. The alphabet was encoded in a binary code that was transmitted by positive or negative voltage pulses which were generated by means of moving an induction coil up and down over a permanent magnet and connecting the coil with the transmission wires by means of the commutator. The page of Gauss' laboratory notebook containing both his code and the first message transmitted, as well as a replica of the telegraph made in the 1850s under the instructions of Weber are kept in the faculty of physics at the University of Göttingen, in Germany.

Gauss was convinced that this communication would be a help to his kingdom's towns. Later in the same year, instead of a Voltaic pile, Gauss used an induction pulse, enabling him to transmit seven letters a minute instead of two. The inventors and university did not have the funds to develop the telegraph on their own, but they received funding from Alexander von Humboldt. Carl August Steinheil in Munich was able to build a telegraph network within the city in 1835–1836. He installed a telegraph line along the first German railroad in 1835.  Steinheil built a telegraph along the Nuremberg - Fürth railway line in 1838, the first earth-return telegraph put into service.

By 1837, William Fothergill Cooke and Charles Wheatstone had co-developed a telegraph system which used a number of needles on a board that could be moved to point to letters of the alphabet. Any number of needles could be used, depending on the number of characters it was required to code. In May 1837 they patented their system. The patent recommended five needles, which coded twenty of the alphabet's 26 letters.

Samuel Morse independently developed and patented a recording electric telegraph in 1837. Morse's assistant Alfred Vail developed an instrument that was called the register for recording the received messages. It embossed dots and dashes on a moving paper tape by a stylus which was operated by an electromagnet. Morse and Vail developed the Morse code signalling alphabet.

Commercial telegraphy

Cooke and Wheatstone system

The first commercial electrical telegraph was the Cooke and Wheatstone system. A demonstration four-needle system was installed on the Euston to Camden Town section of Robert Stephenson's London and Birmingham Railway in 1837 for signalling rope-hauling of locomotives. It was rejected in favour of pneumatic whistles. This was a five-needle, six-wire system. A major advantage of this system was it displayed the letter being sent so operators did not need to learn a code. This system suffered from failing insulation on the underground cables. When the line was extended to Slough in 1843, the telegraph was converted to a one-needle, two-wire system with uninsulated wires on poles. The cost of installing wires was ultimately more economically significant than the cost of training operators. The one-needle telegraph proved highly successful on British railways, and 15,000 sets were still in use at the end of the nineteenth century. Some remained in service in the 1930s. The Electric Telegraph Company, the world's first public telegraphy company was formed in 1845 by financier John Lewis Ricardo and Cooke.

Wheatstone ABC telegraph

Wheatstone developed a practical alphabetical system in 1840 called the A.B.C. System, used mostly on private wires. This consisted of a "communicator" at the sending end and an "indicator" at the receiving end. The communicator consisted of a circular dial with a pointer and the 26 letters of the alphabet (and four punctuation marks) around its circumference. Against each letter was a key that could be pressed. A transmission would begin with the pointers on the dials at both ends set to the start position. The transmitting operator would then press down the key corresponding to the letter to be transmitted. In the base of the communicator was a magneto actuated by a handle on the front. This would be turned to apply an alternating voltage to the line. Each half cycle of the current would advance the pointers at both ends by one position. When the pointer reached the position of the depressed key, it would stop and the magneto would be disconnected from the line. The communicator's pointer was geared to the magneto mechanism. The indicator's pointer was moved by a polarised electromagnet whose armature was coupled to it through an escapement. Thus the alternating line voltage moved the indicator's pointer on to the position of the depressed key on the communicator. Pressing another key would then release the pointer and the previous key, and re-connect the magneto to the line. These machines were very robust and simple to operate, and they stayed in use in Britain until well into the 20th century.

Morse system

The Morse system uses a single wire between offices. At the sending station, an operator taps on a switch called a telegraph key, spelling out text messages in Morse code.  Originally, the armature was intended to make marks on paper tape, but operators learned to interpret the clicks and it was more efficient to write down the message directly.

In 1851, a conference in Vienna of countries in the German-Austrian Telegraph Union (which included many central European countries) adopted the Morse telegraph as the system for international communications. The international Morse code adopted was considerably modified from the original American Morse code, and was based on a code used on Hamburg railways (Gerke, 1848). A common code was a necessary step to allow direct telegraph connection between countries.  With different codes, additional operators were required to translate and retransmit the message.  In 1865, a conference in Paris adopted Gerke's code as the International Morse code and was henceforth the international standard.  The US, however, continued to use American Morse code internally for some time, hence international messages required retransmission in both directions.

In the United States, the Morse/Vail telegraph was quickly deployed in the two decades following the first demonstration in 1844. The overland telegraph connected the west coast of the continent to the east coast by 24 October 1861, bringing an end to the Pony Express.

Foy–Breguet system

France was slow to adopt the electrical telegraph, because of the extensive optical telegraph system built during the Napoleonic era.  There was also serious concern that an electrical telegraph could be quickly put out of action by enemy saboteurs, something that was much more difficult to do with optical telegraphs which had no exposed hardware between stations.  The Foy-Breguet telegraph was eventually adopted.  This was a two-needle system using two signal wires but displayed in a uniquely different way to other needle telegraphs.  The needles made symbols similar to the Chappe optical system symbols, making it more familiar to the telegraph operators.  The optical system was decommissioned starting in 1846, but not completely until 1855.  In that year the Foy-Breguet system was replaced with the Morse system.

Expansion
As well as the rapid expansion of the use of the telegraphs along the railways, they soon spread into the field of mass communication with the instruments being installed in post offices. The era of mass personal communication had begun. Telegraph networks were expensive to build, but financing was readily available, especially from London bankers. By 1852, National systems were in operation in major countries: 

The New York and Mississippi Valley Printing Telegraph Company, for example, was created in 1852 in Rochester, New York and eventually became the Western Union Telegraph Company. Although many countries had telegraph networks, there was no worldwide interconnection. Message by post was still the primary means of communication to countries outside Europe.

Telegraphy was introduced in Central Asia during the 1870s.

Telegraphic improvements

A continuing goal in telegraphy was to reduce the cost per message by reducing hand-work, or increasing the sending rate. There were many experiments with moving pointers, and various electrical encodings. However, most systems were too complicated and unreliable. A successful expedient to reduce the cost per message was the development of telegraphese.

The first system that did not require skilled technicians to operate was Charles Wheatstone's ABC system in 1840 in which the letters of the alphabet were arranged around a clock-face, and the signal caused a needle to indicate the letter. This early system required the receiver to be present in real time to record the message and it reached speeds of up to 15 words a minute.

In 1846, Alexander Bain patented a chemical telegraph in Edinburgh. The signal current moved an iron pen across a moving paper tape soaked in a mixture of ammonium nitrate and potassium ferrocyanide, decomposing the chemical and producing readable blue marks in Morse code. The speed of the printing telegraph was 16 and a half words per minute, but messages still required translation into English by live copyists. Chemical telegraphy came to an end in the US in 1851, when the Morse group defeated the Bain patent in the US District Court.

For a brief period, starting with the New York–Boston line in 1848, some telegraph networks began to employ sound operators, who were trained to understand Morse code aurally. Gradually, the use of sound operators eliminated the need for telegraph receivers to include register and tape. Instead, the receiving instrument was developed into a "sounder", an electromagnet that was energized by a current and attracted a small iron lever. When the sounding key was opened or closed, the sounder lever struck an anvil. The Morse operator distinguished a dot and a dash by the short or long interval between the two clicks. The message was then written out in long-hand.

Royal Earl House developed and patented a letter-printing telegraph system in 1846 which employed an alphabetic keyboard for the transmitter and automatically printed the letters on paper at the receiver, and followed this up with a steam-powered version in 1852. Advocates of printing telegraphy said it would eliminate Morse operators' errors. The House machine was used on four main American telegraph lines by 1852. The speed of the House machine was announced as 2600 words an hour.

David Edward Hughes invented the printing telegraph in 1855; it used a keyboard of 26 keys for the alphabet and a spinning type wheel that determined the letter being transmitted by the length of time that had elapsed since the previous transmission. The system allowed for automatic recording on the receiving end. The system was very stable and accurate and became accepted around the world.

The next improvement was the Baudot code of 1874. French engineer Émile Baudot patented a printing telegraph in which the signals were translated automatically into typographic characters. Each character was assigned a five-bit code, mechanically interpreted from the state of five on/off switches. Operators had to maintain a steady rhythm, and the usual speed of operation was 30 words per minute.

By this point, reception had been automated, but the speed and accuracy of the transmission were still limited to the skill of the human operator. The first practical automated system was patented by Charles Wheatstone. The message (in Morse code) was typed onto a piece of perforated tape using a keyboard-like device called the 'Stick Punch'. The transmitter automatically ran the tape through and transmitted the message at the then exceptionally high speed of 70 words per minute.

Teleprinters

An early successful teleprinter was invented by Frederick G. Creed. In Glasgow he created his first keyboard perforator, which used compressed air to punch the holes. He also created a reperforator (receiving perforator) and a printer. The reperforator punched incoming Morse signals onto paper tape and the printer decoded this tape to produce alphanumeric characters on plain paper. This was the origin of the Creed High Speed Automatic Printing System, which could run at an unprecedented 200 words per minute. His system was adopted by the Daily Mail for daily transmission of the newspaper contents.

With the invention of the teletypewriter, telegraphic encoding became fully automated. Early teletypewriters used the ITA-1 Baudot code, a five-bit code. This yielded only thirty-two codes, so it was over-defined into two "shifts", "letters" and "figures". An explicit, unshared shift code prefaced each set of letters and figures. In 1901, Baudot's code was modified by Donald Murray.

In the 1930s, teleprinters were produced by Teletype in the US, Creed in Britain and Siemens in Germany.

By 1935, message routing was the last great barrier to full automation. Large telegraphy providers began to develop systems that used telephone-like rotary dialling to connect teletypewriters. These resulting systems were called "Telex" (TELegraph EXchange). Telex machines first performed rotary-telephone-style pulse dialling for circuit switching, and then sent data by ITA2. This "type A" Telex routing functionally automated message routing.

The first wide-coverage Telex network was implemented in Germany during the 1930s as a network used to communicate within the government.

At the rate of 45.45 (±0.5%) baud – considered speedy at the time – up to 25 telex channels could share a single long-distance telephone channel by using voice frequency telegraphy multiplexing, making telex the least expensive method of reliable long-distance communication.

Automatic teleprinter exchange service was introduced into Canada by CPR Telegraphs and CN Telegraph in July 1957 and in 1958, Western Union started to build a Telex network in the United States.

The harmonic telegraph

The most expensive aspect of a telegraph system was the installation – the laying of the wire, which was often very long. The costs would be better covered by finding a way to send more than one message at a time through the single wire, thus increasing revenue per wire. Early devices included the duplex and the quadruplex which allowed, respectively, one or two telegraph transmissions in each direction.  However, an even greater number of channels was desired on the busiest lines.  In the latter half of the 1800s, several inventors worked towards creating a method for doing just that, including Charles Bourseul, Thomas Edison, Elisha Gray, and Alexander Graham Bell.

One approach was to have resonators of several different frequencies act as carriers of a modulated on-off signal.  This was the harmonic telegraph, a form of frequency-division multiplexing. These various frequencies, referred to as harmonics, could then be combined into one complex signal and sent down the single wire. On the receiving end, the frequencies would be separated with a matching set of resonators.

With a set of frequencies being carried down a single wire, it was realized that the human voice itself could be transmitted electrically through the wire. This effort led to the invention of the telephone. (While the work toward packing multiple telegraph signals onto one wire led to telephony, later advances would pack multiple voice signals onto one wire by increasing the bandwidth by modulating frequencies much higher than human hearing. Eventually, the bandwidth was widened much further by using laser light signals sent through fiber optic cables. Fiber optic transmission can carry 25,000 telephone signals simultaneously down a single fiber.)

Oceanic telegraph cables

Soon after the first successful telegraph systems were operational, the possibility of transmitting messages across the sea by way of submarine communications cables was first proposed. One of the primary technical challenges was to sufficiently insulate the submarine cable to prevent the electric current from leaking out into the water. In 1842, a Scottish surgeon William Montgomerie introduced gutta-percha, the adhesive juice of the Palaquium gutta tree, to Europe. Michael Faraday and Wheatstone soon discovered the merits of gutta-percha as an insulator, and in 1845, the latter suggested that it should be employed to cover the wire which was proposed to be laid from Dover to Calais. Gutta-percha was used as insulation on a wire laid across the Rhine between Deutz and Cologne. In 1849, C. V. Walker, electrician to the South Eastern Railway, submerged a  wire coated with gutta-percha off the coast from Folkestone, which was tested successfully.

John Watkins Brett, an engineer from Bristol, sought and obtained permission from Louis-Philippe in 1847 to establish telegraphic communication between France and England. The first undersea cable was laid in 1850, connecting the two countries and was followed by connections to Ireland and the Low Countries.

The Atlantic Telegraph Company was formed in London in 1856 to undertake to construct a commercial telegraph cable across the Atlantic Ocean. It was successfully completed on 18 July 1866 by the ship SS Great Eastern, captained by Sir James Anderson, after many mishaps along the away. John Pender, one of the men on the Great Eastern, later founded several telecommunications companies primarily laying cables between Britain and Southeast Asia. Earlier transatlantic submarine cables installations were attempted in 1857, 1858 and 1865. The 1857 cable only operated intermittently for a few days or weeks before it failed. The study of underwater telegraph cables accelerated interest in mathematical analysis of very long transmission lines. The telegraph lines from Britain to India were connected in 1870. (Those several companies combined to form the Eastern Telegraph Company in 1872.) The HMS Challenger expedition in 1873–1876 mapped the ocean floor for future underwater telegraph cables.

Australia was first linked to the rest of the world in October 1872 by a submarine telegraph cable at Darwin. This brought news reports from the rest of the world. The telegraph across the Pacific was completed in 1902, finally encircling the world.

From the 1850s until well into the 20th century, British submarine cable systems dominated the world system. This was set out as a formal strategic goal, which became known as the All Red Line. In 1896, there were thirty cable laying ships in the world and twenty-four of them were owned by British companies. In 1892, British companies owned and operated two-thirds of the world's cables and by 1923, their share was still 42.7 percent.

Cable and Wireless Company

Cable & Wireless was a British telecommunications company that traced its origins back to the 1860s, with Sir John Pender as the founder, although the name was only adopted in 1934. It was formed from successive mergers including: 
The Falmouth, Malta, Gibraltar Telegraph Company
The British Indian Submarine Telegraph Company
The Marseilles, Algiers and Malta Telegraph Company
The Eastern Telegraph Company
The Eastern Extension Australasia and China Telegraph Company
The Eastern and Associated Telegraph Companies

Telegraphy and longitude
Main article § Section: .

The telegraph was very important for sending time signals to determine longitude, providing greater accuracy than previously available. Longitude was measured by comparing local time (for example local noon occurs when the sun is at its highest above the horizon) with absolute time (a time that is the same for an observer anywhere on earth). If the local times of two places differ by one hour, the difference in longitude between them is 15° (360°/24h). Before telegraphy, absolute time could be obtained from astronomical events, such as eclipses, occultations or lunar distances, or by transporting an accurate clock (a chronometer) from one location to the other.

The idea of using the telegraph to transmit a time signal for longitude determination was suggested by François Arago to Samuel Morse in 1837, and the first test of this idea was made by Capt. Wilkes of the U.S. Navy in 1844, over Morse's line between Washington and Baltimore. The method was soon in practical use for longitude determination, in particular by the U.S. Coast Survey, and over longer and longer distances as the telegraph network spread across North America and the world, and as technical developments improved accuracy and productivity

The "telegraphic longitude net" soon became worldwide. Transatlantic links between Europe and North America were established in 1866 and 1870. The US Navy extended observations into the West Indies and Central and South America with an additional transatlantic link from South America to Lisbon between 1874 and 1890. British, Russian and US observations created a chain from Europe through Suez, Aden, Madras, Singapore, China and Japan, to Vladivostok, thence to Saint Petersburg and back to Western Europe.

Australia was linked to Singapore via Java in 1871 and the web circled the globe in 1902 with the connection of Australia and New Zealand to Canada via the All Red Line. The double determination of longitudes from east to west and from west to east agreed within one second of arc ( second of time – less than 30 metres).

Telegraphy in war
The ability to send telegrams brought obvious advantages to those conducting war. Secret messages were encoded, so interception alone would not be sufficient for the opposing side to gain an advantage. There were also geographical constraints on intercepting the telegraph cables that improved security, however once radio telegraphy was developed interception became far more widespread.

Crimean War
The Crimean War was one of the first conflicts to use telegraphs and was one of the first to be documented extensively. In 1854, the government in London created a military Telegraph Detachment for the Army commanded by an officer of the Royal Engineers. It was to comprise twenty-five men from the Royal Corps of Sappers & Miners trained by the Electric Telegraph Company to construct and work the first field electric telegraph.

Journalistic recording of the war was provided by William Howard Russell (writing for The Times newspaper) with photographs by Roger Fenton. News from war correspondents kept the public of the nations involved in the war informed of the day-to-day events in a way that had not been possible in any previous war. After the French extended the telegraph to the coast of the Black Sea in late 1854, the news reached London in two days. When the British laid an underwater cable to the Crimean peninsula in April 1855, news reached London in a few hours. The daily news reports energised public opinion, which brought down the government and led to Lord Palmerston becoming prime minister.

American Civil War
During the American Civil War the telegraph proved its value as a tactical, operational, and strategic communication medium and an important contributor to Union victory. By contrast the Confederacy failed to make effective use of the South's much smaller telegraph network. Prior to the War the telegraph systems were primarily used in the commercial sector. Government buildings were not inter-connected with telegraph lines, but relied on runners to carry messages back and forth. Before the war the Government saw no need to connect lines within city limits, however, they did see the use in connections between cities. Washington D.C. being the hub of government, it had the most connections, but there were only a few lines running north and south out of the city. It wasn't until the Civil War that the government saw the true potential of the telegraph system. Soon after the shelling of Fort Sumter, the South cut telegraph lines running into D.C., which put the city in a state of panic because they feared an immediate Southern invasion.

The telegraph was not only important for communication within the armed forces, but also in the civilian sector, helping political leaders to maintain control over their districts.

Even before the war, the American Telegraph Company censored suspect messages informally to block aid to the secession movement. During the war, Secretary of War Simon Cameron, and later Edwin Stanton, wanted control over the telegraph lines to maintain the flow of information. Early in the war, one of Stanton's first acts as Secretary of War was to move telegraph lines from ending at McClellan's headquarters to terminating at the War Department. Stanton himself said "[telegraphy] is my right arm". Telegraphy assisted Northern victories, including the Battle of Antietam (1862), the Battle of Chickamauga (1863), and Sherman's March to the Sea (1864).

The telegraph system still had its flaws. The USMT, while the main source of telegraphers and cable, was still a civilian agency. Most operators were first hired by the telegraph companies and then contracted out to the War Department. This created tension between Generals and their operators. One source of irritation was that USMT operators did not have to follow military authority. Usually they performed without hesitation, but they were not required to, so Albert Myer created a U.S. Army Signal Corps in February 1863. As the new head of the Signal Corps, Myer tried to get all telegraph and flag signaling under his command, and therefore subject to military discipline. After creating the Signal Corps, Myer pushed to further develop new telegraph systems. While the USMT relied primarily on civilian lines and operators, the Signal Corp's new field telegraph could be deployed and dismantled faster than USMT's system.

First World War
During World War I, Britain's telegraph communications were almost completely uninterrupted, while it was able to quickly cut Germany's cables worldwide. The British government censored telegraph cable companies in an effort to root out espionage and restrict financial transactions with Central Powers nations. British access to transatlantic cables and its codebreaking expertise led to the Zimmermann Telegram incident that contributed to the US joining the war. Despite British acquisition of German colonies and expansion into the Middle East, debt from the war led to Britain's control over telegraph cables to weaken while US control grew.

Second World War

World War II revived the 'cable war' of 1914–1918. In 1939, German-owned cables across the Atlantic were cut once again, and, in 1940, Italian cables to South America and Spain were cut in retaliation for Italian action against two of the five British cables linking Gibraltar and Malta. Electra House, Cable & Wireless's head office and central cable station, was damaged by German bombing in 1941.

Resistance movements in occupied Europe sabotaged communications facilities such as telegraph lines, forcing the Germans to use wireless telegraphy, which could then be intercepted by Britain.
The Germans developed a highly complex teleprinter attachment (German: Schlüssel-Zusatz, "cipher attachment") that was used for enciphering telegrams, using the Lorenz cipher, between German High Command (OKW) and the army groups in the field. These contained situation reports, battle plans, and discussions of strategy and tactics. Britain intercepted these signals, diagnosed how the encrypting machine worked, and decrypted a large amount of teleprinter traffic.

End of the telegraph era

In America, the end of the telegraph era can be associated with the fall of the Western Union Telegraph Company. Western Union was the leading telegraph provider for America and was seen as the best competition for the National Bell Telephone Company. Western Union and Bell were both invested in telegraphy and telephone technology. Western Union's decision to allow Bell to gain the advantage in telephone technology was the result of Western Union's upper management's failure to foresee the surpassing of the telephone over the, at the time, dominant telegraph system. Western Union soon lost the legal battle for the rights to their telephone copyrights. This led to Western Union agreeing to a lesser position in the telephone competition, which in turn led to the lessening of the telegraph.

While the telegraph was not the focus of the legal battles that occurred around 1878, the companies that were affected by the effects of the battle were the main powers of telegraphy at the time. Western Union thought that the agreement of 1878 would solidify telegraphy as the long-range communication of choice. However, due to the underestimates of telegraph's future and poor contracts, Western Union found itself declining. AT&T acquired working control of Western Union in 1909 but relinquished it in 1914 under threat of antitrust action.  AT&T bought Western Union's electronic mail and Telex businesses in 1990.

Although commercial "telegraph" services are still available in many countries, transmission is usually done via a computer network rather than a dedicated wired connection.

See also

 92 Code
 Aurora (astronomy)
 American Telephone and Telegraph Company (AT&T)
 Bell Canada
 Geomagnetically induced current
 Great Northern Telegraph Company
 Neutral direct-current telegraph system
 Western Electric Company

References

Bibliography 

Bowers, Brian, Sir Charles Wheatstone: 1802–1875, IET, 2001 
 
 
 
 
 
 
 Holzmann, Gerard J.; Pehrson, Björn, The Early History of Data Networks, Wiley, 1995 
 
  Attributed to 
 
 
 Mercer, David, The Telephone: The Life Story of a Technology, Greenwood Publishing Group, 2006

Further reading 

 Cooke, W.F., The Electric Telegraph, Was it invented by Prof. Wheatstone?, London 1856.
 
 Gauß, C. F., Works, Göttingen 1863–1933.
 Howe, Daniel Walker, What Hath God Wrought: The Transformation of America, 1815–1848, Oxford University Press, 2007 .
 Peterson, M.J. Roots of Interconnection: Communications, Transportation and Phases of the Industrial Revolution, International Dimensions of Ethics Education in Science and Engineering Background Reading, Version 1; February 2008.
 Steinheil, C.A., Ueber Telegraphie, München 1838.
 Yates, JoAnne. The Telegraph's Effect on Nineteenth Century Markets and Firms, Massachusetts Institute of Technology, pp. 149–163.

External links 

 Morse Telegraph Club, Inc. (The Morse Telegraph Club is an international non-profit organization dedicated to the perpetuation of the knowledge and traditions of telegraphy.)
 https://web.archive.org/web/20050829153213/http://collections.ic.gc.ca/canso/index.htm
Shilling's telegraph, an exhibit of the A.S. Popov Central Museum of Communications
 History of electromagnetic telegraph
 The first electric telegraphs
 The Dawn of Telegraphy 
 Pavel Shilling and his telegraph- article in PCWeek, Russian edition.
 Distant Writing – The History of the Telegraph Companies in Britain between 1838 and 1868
 NASA – Carrington Super Flare  NASA 6 May 2008
 How Cables Unite The World – a 1902 article about telegraph networks and technology from the magazine The World's Work
 
 Indiana telegraph and telephone collection, Rare Books and Manuscripts, Indiana State Library
Wonders of electricity and the elements, being a popular account of modern electrical and magnetic discoveries, magnetism and electric machines, the electric telegraph and the electric light, and the metal bases, salt, and acids from Science History Institute Digital Collections
The electro magnetic telegraph: with an historical account of its rise, progress, and present condition from Science History Institute Digital Collections

19th-century inventions
British inventions
Telegraphy
Telegraph

sl:Telegraf
fi:Lennätin
zh:电报